Bill Gavin (November 6, 1907 – January 27, 1985) was an American radio personality and publisher of the influential Gavin Report.

Life and education
Gavin was born in Chetek, Wisconsin in 1907.  He attended the University of Wisconsin-Eau Claire and the University of California-Berkeley.
Before his radio career, he was a teacher, pianist and singer.  He briefly traveled with an all-male vocal group called The Blenders.  He died of cancer in 1985 at the age of 77.

Career
Gavin founded the Gavin Report in 1958. It was a publication that "monitored air play for Top 40 records, and later expanded to other categories; it [was] used as a programming aid by radio stations and record companies." The publication gathered information from various radio stations and was used to measure song popularity. Gavin was called the "most powerful man in the business." It was also said that "every record company subscribed to and quoted the Gavin Report...Everybody copied him, but he originated the thing."

Gavin is also noted for his progressive stance in regards to race relations. He worked to help African-Americans break into the radio business by playing black artists and hiring black Disc-Jockeys at a time when it was unpopular to do so.

References

American radio personalities
1985 deaths
American publishers (people)
1907 births
University of California, Berkeley alumni
University of Wisconsin–Eau Claire alumni
20th-century American businesspeople
People from Chetek, Wisconsin